Rayki is a rural locality (a village) in Muromtsevskoye Rural Settlement, Sudogodsky District, Vladimir Oblast, Russia. The population was 22 as of 2010.

Geography 
Rayki is located on the Sudogda River, 8 km south of Sudogda (the district's administrative centre) by road. Berezhki is the nearest rural locality.

References 

Rural localities in Sudogodsky District